Antony James Towner (born 2 May 1955) is an English former footballer who made more than 400 appearances in the Football League playing as a right winger. He is most fondly remembered by home town club Brighton & Hove Albion and Rotherham United with whom he won Division 3 and was later immortalised in an episode of Chuckle Vision post retirement.

Playing Career

The right winger spent much of the 1970s with his hometown club Brighton & Hove Albion playing 162 times before moving to Millwall later in the decade. 

Towner, when interviewed for a Rotherham United fan site in 2017, stated “I was a (Brighton) Albion fan as a kid, in Bevendean, and I joined them straight from school at 15, as an apprentice. I already had the ‘Tiger’ nickname when I got into the team in 1973 – I think it was one of Alan Duffy‘s. I must have tackled him a bit too hard in training, or something. Tiger was a great nickname, and I loved it.” 

Towner was sold from Milwall to Rotherham United along with John Seasman for a joint fee of £165,000 in 1980. £95,000 believed to be Towner's fee. 

Towner proved himself to be a skilful, pacy right winger and great crosser of the ball, forming a great partnership with another Rotherham legend Ronnie Moore. Towner was a key figure in Rotherham's 1981 Division 3 winning side, doing the double over local rivals Sheffield United on the way.

Talking about his time at Rotherham, Towner reflected “They were probably my best years, my most consistent, anyway. I was 26, 27 years old – at my peak. I had three tremendous years.”

Video footage of Rotherham final game of the season verusu Plymouth Argyle shows Towler connecting with Moore to get the first goal in a 2-0 victory with that result crowning Rotherham as champions of the 1980-81 season.

After spending a brief loan spell at Sheffield United, Towner moved to Wolverhampton Wanderers for £100,000, where he spent the 1983-84 season in top-flight football. 

Towner famously had been on then manager Graham Hawkins pre-season shopping list, presented to chairman Derek Dougan, but Hawkins was made furious to find that Dougan had spent so much of the budget on him whilst he and head coach Jim Barron were out of the country. Towner would move to Charlton Athletic for just £15,000 at the end of the season.

Dougan had previously seen Towner play at Rotherham whilst covering TV work in Yorkshire as a pundit.

Towner started that campaign being brought off the bench in a 1-1 opening day draw at home to Liverpool and from then on in, Towner would be a regular for the Wolves, making 35 appearances and chipping in with two goals, including a long-range header past Chris Woods in a win against Norwich.

Asked about his season at the Molineux by the Express & Star in 2021, Towner mused  “I joined Wolves from Rotherham, and it was a different world, I had been there a week and then we were flying off to Sweden for pre-season. One minute I am at Rotherham and the next we are flying out to Europe – it was all very new to me. Then you have Liverpool and Arsenal in the first two games and it was very much a case of welcome to the big league. But that is what I wanted, 100 per cent. Any player wants to test himself against the very best, and Liverpool were very much the best at that time – they had so many star players."

He later played for Charlton Athletic, Rochdale and Cambridge United.

A final taste of the big time came with non-league Crawley Town in a 1991–92 FA Cup run.

Crawley came up 4-2 victors against Third Division Northampton Town with Towner being credited an assist before being knocked out the cup in the third round when they were defeated 5-0 away at Brighton, with Towner coming off the bench to a great reception against the club where it had all began.

Jesper Olsen was rumoured to have based his winger play on Tony which led to his move to Manchester United

Popular Culture
Towner and his Rotherham forward partner Ronnie Moore were depicted in 1996 Chuckle Vision episode "Football Heroes"

During the episode Paul Chuckle and his brother Barry Chuckle are on their way to a Rotherham  United football match when they come across Towner and Moore, played by actors who ask directions to the stadium to play in a veterans match. 

With the Chuckle brothers giving confusing directions, the players dont make it to the ground in time and in a case if mistaken identity the chuckle brothers are sent out to play, resulting in them scoring an own goal and being chased off the pitch by the manager.

Post Football

Since retiring from football, Towner has ran and managed his own home removal business and also visits his local Brighton & Hove Albion to attend matches.

References

Greatest XI (MillersMad)
Millwall FC Hall of Fame

1955 births
Living people
Footballers from Brighton
English footballers
Association football wingers
Brighton & Hove Albion F.C. players
Millwall F.C. players
Rotherham United F.C. players
Sheffield United F.C. players
Wolverhampton Wanderers F.C. players
Charlton Athletic F.C. players
Rochdale A.F.C. players
Cambridge United F.C. players
Ebbsfleet United F.C. players
English Football League players